Beatriz Bermúdez de Velasco, also known as La Bermuda, was a Spanish woman soldier during the Spanish Conquest of Mexico.

Biography
She became famous during the expedition of Hernán Cortés to Mexico according to the Spanish chronicler Francisco Cervantes de Salazar. It is unclear if she fought personally at any point, but she became famous for her leadership skills. During the Spanish siege to Tenochtitlan, she harangued the Spanish and allied troops that were on retreat to persuaded them to go back to combat, after which the troops that had run away regrouped and returned to finally defeat the Mexica coalition. She was recognized by her companions and the crown as an instrumental piece in avoiding a second Spanish defeat against the Mexica Empire.

References

Spanish explorers
History of the Aztecs
16th-century Spanish women
Women in war in Mexico
Women in the Conquest of Mexico
Year of birth uncertain
Year of death uncertain
Women in 16th-century warfare